Zarichne, formerly Kirovsk, is an urban-type settlement in Kramatorsk Raion of Donetsk Oblast, Ukraine. Population: 

In 2016, Kirovsk was renamed to Zarichne, conforming to the law prohibiting names of Communist origin.

References

Urban-type settlements in Kramatorsk Raion
Izyumsky Uyezd